The 2018–19 Vijay Hazare Trophy was the 17th season of the Vijay Hazare Trophy, a List A cricket tournament in India. It was contested by the 37 domestic cricket teams of India, with nine teams in the Plate Group. The group stage was started on 19 September 2018, with the top team from the Plate Group progressing to the quarter-finals of the competition.

On 20 September 2018, after Pondicherry's first-round match, the Board of Control for Cricket in India (BCCI) reversed its decision of allowing extra outstation players for the team.

In the Round 8 fixture between Bihar and Sikkim, Sikkim were bowled out for 46 runs, with Bihar winning by 292 runs, the biggest margin of defeat by runs in Indian domestic cricket. In the Round 11 fixture between Uttarakhand and Sikkim, Uttarakhand's Karn Kaushal made the first double-century in the history of the Vijay Hazare Trophy, scoring 202 runs.

Bihar progressed from the Plate Group to the knock-out phase of the tournament.

Points table

Fixtures

Round 1

Round 2

Round 3

Round 4

Round 5

Round 6

Round 7

Round 8

Round 9

Round 10

Round 11

Round 12

References

Vijay Hazare Trophy
Vijay Hazare Trophy
Vijay Hazare Trophy